The Cape flat lizard or Namaqua flat lizard (Platysaurus capensis) is a lizard in the Cordylidae family found in Namibia and South Africa.

Description

Females and juveniles have a dark brown back with three wide white stripes which run down head to tail. Their bellies are white with a black blotch in the center. Adult males, on the other hand, have the upper half of their body bright blue, sometimes with pale spots or stripes. The back half, including the tail, is dark red. Adults are 5 to 6.6 inches long.

Geography
This lizard lives in the southwestern part of Africa, in Namibia and South Africa. The Cape flat lizard lives in deserts with many rocks.

Habits
Cape flat lizards hunt by ambush, waiting under a shady spot for an insect to pass by. It will also eat flowers and berries. Cape flat lizards are shy and often run for cover when threatened. People often see these lizards from a distance on top of rocks. They may live in small groups. Cape flat lizards lay their eggs in November or December.

See also
Platysaurus
Cordylidae

References

External links

Platysaurus
Reptiles of South Africa
Reptiles of Namibia
Lizards of Africa
Reptiles described in 1844
Taxa named by Andrew Smith (zoologist)